Idlewild is a compilation album by the alternative rock band They Might Be Giants. It was released in 2014, and is the third anthology released by the group through its own Idlewild Recordings. The album includes songs previously released between 1999's Long Tall Weekend and 2013's Nanobots. The press release for the album notes it is "neither a 'best of' nor a 'rarities' set", but rather "an ultra-vivid illustration" of the band's "prodigious output and singular musical vision."

Track listing

References

External links
Idlewild at This Might Be A Wiki

2014 compilation albums
They Might Be Giants compilation albums
Idlewild Recordings compilation albums
Lojinx albums